Ballipadu is a village in Palakol mandal, located in West Godavari district of Andhra Pradesh, India. Lankalakoderu and Viravasaram Railway Stations are the nearest railway stations.

Demographics 

 Census of India, Ballipadu had a population of 1400. The total population constitute, 694 males and 706 females with a sex ratio of 1017 females per 1000 males. 162 children are in the age group of 0–6 years, with sex ratio of 1017. The average literacy rate stands at 79.24%.

References

Villages in West Godavari district